San Siro Stadio is the western terminus station of Line 5 of the Milan Metro.

History 
The works for the construction of the station began in November 2010, as part of the second section of the line, from Garibaldi FS to San Siro Stadio. This station is one of the two stops of this second section where a tunnel boring machine was used to build the galleries. The station was opened to the public on 29 April 2015, a few days before the official opening of Expo 2015.

Station structure 
San Siro Stadio is an underground station with two tracks served by two side platforms and, like all the other stations on Line 5, is wheelchair accessible.

Since this station is situated near San Siro stadium, it was designed to accommodate a high people flow. For this reason, besides the regular exits, there is also a large entrance equipped with full height turnstiles able to regulate the flows coming from the stadium; this will allow the entrance of maximum 500 people every three minutes, avoiding the situation of overcrowding of platforms after matches.

Interchanges 
Near this station are located:
  Tram stops (line 16)
  Bus stops

References

Line 5 (Milan Metro) stations
Railway stations opened in 2015
2015 establishments in Italy
Railway stations in Italy opened in the 21st century